The Master and Servant Act 1867  (30 & 31 Vict c 141) was an Act of Parliament of the United Kingdom which sought to criminalise breach of contract by workers against their employers. The Employers and Workmen Act 1875 (38 & 39 Vict c 90) was passed in substitution for this Act.

Contents

See also
UK labour law
Master and Servant Act

References
Davis, James Edward. The Master and Servant Act, 1867. Butterworths. London. Hodges, Smith and Co. Dublin. 1868.
Davis, James Edward. "Lord Elcho's Master and Servant Act,1867". The Labour Laws. Butterworths. Fleet Street, London. 1875. Chapter 2. Pages 15 to 27. See also page 99.
Paterson, William (ed). The Practical Statutes of the Session 1867. Horace Cox. London. 1867. Pages 389 to 407.
Holdsworth, William Andrew. "Of the Jurisdiction of the Magistrates under the Master and Servant Act 1867". The Law of Master and Servant. George Routledge and Sons. London. 1873. Chapter 14. Pages 135 to 146.
"Master and Servant Act, 1867" (1872) 16 Journal of Jurisprudence 204

United Kingdom Acts of Parliament 1867
Repealed United Kingdom Acts of Parliament